Cheviot Mountain is a summit in Alberta, Canada.

Cheviot Mountain takes its name from Cheviot Hills, at the Anglo-Scottish border.

References

Two-thousanders of Alberta
Alberta's Rockies